Kay WalkingStick (born March 2, 1935) is a Native American landscape artist and a member of the Cherokee Nation. Her later landscape paintings, executed in oil paint on wood panels often include patterns based on Southwest American Indian rugs, pottery, and other artworks.

WalkingStick's works are in the collections of many universities and museums, like the Metropolitan Museum of Art, the Israel Museum, the National Museum of Canada, and the Smithsonian National Museum of the American Indian. She is an author and was a professor in the art department at Cornell University, where she taught painting and drawing. She has been accepted into many artist residency programs which gave her time away from teaching duties to paint. WalkingStick won many awards and in 1995 was included in H.W. Janson's History of Art, a standard textbook used by university art departments.

Personal life
Kay WalkingStick was born in Syracuse, New York, on March 2, 1935, the daughter of Simon Ralph Walkingstick and Emma McKaig Walkingstick. Emma was of Scottish-Irish heritage, and Kay's father, Ralph, was a member of the Cherokee Nation, who wrote and spoke the Cherokee language. Ralph was born in the Cherokee Nation capital of Tahlequah, Oklahoma, and attended Dartmouth College. Kay's parents had four other children, and as they raised their family Ralph Walkingstick worked in the oil fields as a geologist. He became an alcoholic. While pregnant with Kay, her mother left Oklahoma with their other children and moved to Syracuse, New York. WalkingStick grew up in Syracuse without having experienced the cultural heritage of her Cherokee ancestors. Her siblings, who spent some of their childhood in Oklahoma, had a better understanding of their father's Cherokee traditions. Her mother told her "Indian stories" and talked about her handsome father. The family was proud to be Native Americans. Kay liked to color and draw from a young age. A number of other members of her family were artists.

WalkingStick married R. Michael Echols in 1959, and they had two children, Michael David Echols and Erica WalkingStick Echols Lowry. Michael Echols died in 1989. She is now married to artist Dirk Bach. They married in November 2013 and live in Easton, Pennsylvania.

Education
WalkingStick received her Bachelor of Fine Arts degree in 1959 from Beaver College, Glenside, Pennsylvania. Ten years later she received the Danforth Foundation Graduate Fellowship for Women, and attended Pratt Institute in Brooklyn, New York. She received her Master of Fine Arts in 1975.

WalkingStick was at the MacDowell Colony in New Hampshire for a month-long residency in both 1970 and 1971. In July 1976 she was an artist-in-residence in Saratoga Springs, New York, at the Yaddo Artists' Colony, and at Montauk, New York, in August 1983 at the William Flanagan Memorial Creative Persons Center. In 1992 she painted at the Conference and Study Center in Bellagio, Italy. In 1995 she was a visiting teacher and artist at the Vermont Studio Center for a month. In 2011, she was awarded an honorary Doctor of Humane Letters degree by Arcadia University.

Career

Artist

She created representational art works after college which for the next 10 years were self-described as "hard-edged" and "realistic". In graduate school during the early 1970s, her work became more abstract and were included in many New York City exhibitions, at a time when Native American artists' works were seldom exhibited. In graduate school she began to study Native American art and history, seeking to understand her "Indianness". WalkingStick began a series of works about the 19th-century Nez Perce "Chief Joseph" who resisted reservation life. She layered wax and acrylic paint, mixed together onto inked canvas and left the design unpainted then cut to create designs. In 1978 she had a solo exhibition at Bertha Urdang Gallery. WalkingStick later integrated other elements into the works, like small rocks, pieces of pottery, metal shavings, and copper. Throughout the process she added paint with her hands or a knife in the areas exposed from the cut wax to create her final work.

In another personal search, Walkingstick created Messages to Papa in 1974 to better understand the conflicted feelings that she had for her father. The work was a stereotypical image of a Native American dwelling, the tipi, although it was not a Cherokee structure. She used the image, as a symbol of Native Americans to people of non-native descent. In the middle of the work she hung a Cherokee language translation of the Lord's Prayer and a letter to her deceased father.

She began making abstract/landscape diptychs in 1985, for which she gained success nationally and internationally. Generally, she made an abstract work on one panel of the diptych and a representational, or realistic, image on the other. She has made landscapes of the Rockies and the Alps and of the ancient southwestern sites, Mesa Verde and Canyon De Chelly from sketches she had made during her visits there. Walkingstick said, "I do not see my paintings as landscapes, per se, but rather as paintings that describe two kinds of perception of the earth. One view is visual and fleeting and the other is abstract and everlasting. These paintings are my attempt to express the mythically inexpressible and to unify the present with eternity."

After her husband died unexpectedly in 1989, she introduced waterfalls to her works, like the painting Abyss, an abstract painting with blood-red water and white foams. She said that the waterfall paintings are "a metaphor for the onrush of time and the unstoppable, ultimate destiny of our lives."
The landscape that she made in 1991, Where Are the Generations? reflects the rugged mountains and desert of the Southwest, at night. The emptiness speaks of the toll that European colonists had on the indigenous population. The words in copper repoussé affixed to the abstract side are: "In 1492 we were 20 million. Now we are 2 million. Where are the children? Where are the generations? Never born" followed by her name in the Cherokee syllabary 

In 1995 she was included in art history textbook, H. W. Janson's History of Art, which is a standard of universities and colleges.

The diptych Gioioso Variation I (2001) of the Italian Alps, inspired by the many trips WalkingStick made to Italy between 1996 and 2003, "contains sensuous, mountain crevasses that fold and ripple to create a lush visual space; on the right side is a dancing couple, brown against a lighter brown ground, both sides under a shiny, gold sky. The physicality and sensuousness of this image is both poetic and erotic."
In 2004 she painted, Wallowa Mountains Memory, Variations, a painting of the Wallowa Mountains, the homeland of the Nez Perce people before they were removed to reservations. A gold leaf sky is used on both side of the diptych painting. On the right side are purple mountains with a Nez Perce corn husk bag design. On the left are gray and white mountains. The painting is now in the Metropolitan Museum in New York City. Later paintings are of American landscape with basket, weaving, pottery or parflêche patterns of the Native American people who live or lived in that same landscape.

Educator
In 1988 WalkingStick was hired by Cornell University in Ithaca, New York, to be an assistant professor of art. She taught there until 1990 when she was employed by the State University of New York, Stony Brook, a position she held for two years. She returned to Cornell University in 1992, where she taught drawing and painting as a full professor, retiring in 2005. She then moved to New York City to work full-time in her studio. She has retired as Professor Emerita of Cornell University.

Awards
She is the recipient of the following:
 1983 - National Endowment of the Arts grant
 1991- Richard A. Florsheim Art Fund Award, Tampa, FL 
 1995 - Joan Mitchell Foundation award
 1996 - National Honor award for Achievement in the Arts, Women's Caucus for Art
 2003 - Distinguished Artist Award from the Eiteljorg Museum of American Indians and Western Art, the first woman to win this award
 2011 - Lee Krasner award for lifetime achievement, the Pollock-Krasner Foundation

Works

Art

Works of art
 Message to Papa, 1974
 Chief Joseph series
 Paper Piece #1, ink, acrylic, and tape; 16" x 20", 1975
 Abyss, 1989
 Where are the Generations?, acrylic, oil, wax and copper; 28" x 50", 1991
 Gioioso Variation I, diptych, 2001
 Wallowa Mountains Memory, Variations, painting on wood, 2004
 Night Magic, 2001.
 Winter Flight, 1998-1999.

Exhibitions
According to author Deborah Everett, "WalkingStick became solidly established in the mainstream art world during the 1980s and 1990s. For instance, her works went on a touring exhibition in 1994 after she exhibited at the Cairo Biennial. Her works have been shown in many European and American exhibitions, including both solo and group exhibitions, a few of which are National Museum of the American Indian, National Gallery of Canada and Heard Museum. She is represented by New York's June Kelly Gallery.

WalkingStick is also honored in the 2015–2016 exhibition "Kay WalkingStick: An American Artist," at the National Museum of the American Indian in Washington, D.C. The show is the first to trace her five-decade-long career and includes many works from private collections, and is accompanied by a comprehensive catalog. The exhibition is currently being toured across the U.S. by the American Federation of Arts.

The Dayton Art Institute in Dayton, Ohio, began its 2017 special exhibition season with "Kay WalkingStick: An American Artist". The exhibit will run February 2017 through May 2017.

On March 1 through 5, 2017, the June Kelly Gallery featured Kay WalkingStick's work at the Art Dealers Association of America Art Fair. The exhibition was held at The Armory at 67th and Park Avenue, New York City.

In 2020, the art of WalkingStick was exhibited in the exhibition Hearts of Our People: Native Women Artists at the Smithsonian American Art Museum.

Collections
WalkingStick's works are in the collections of:

 Albright-Knox Art Gallery, an art museum in Buffalo, New York
 Bailey-Howe Library, University of Vermont
 Eli and Edythe Broad Art Museum (formerly the Kresge Museum of Art), East Lansing, Michigan
 Cherokee Heritage Center, Park Hill, Oklahoma
 Cherokee Nation Foundation, Tahlequah, Cherokee Nation
 Dartmouth College, Hanover, New Hampshire
 Davidson College, North Carolina
 Denver Art Museum, Colorado
 Detroit Institute of Arts, Michigan
 Eiteljorg Museum of American Indians and Western Art, Indianapolis
 Gilcrease Museum, Tulsa, Oklahoma
 Heard Museum, Phoenix
 Herbert F. Johnson Museum of Art, Cornell, Ithaca
 Israel Museum, Jerusalem
 La Jolla Museum of Contemporary Art, California
 Metropolitan Museum of Art, New York
 Montclair Art Museum, New Jersey
 Muscarelle Museum of Art, Virginia
 National Gallery of Canada, Ottawa
 Smithsonian National Museum of the American Indian, Washington, D.C.
 Neuberger Museum of Art, Purchase, New York
 Newark Museum, New Jersey
 New Jersey State Museum 
 Peabody Essex Museum, Salem, Massachusetts
 San Diego Museum of Art
 Southern Plains Indian Museum, Anadarko, Oklahoma
 Spencer Museum of Art, Lawrence, KS 
 Steinman Hall and Shepard Hall, City University of New York

Publications
 Kay WalkingStick Alfred Bierstadt. "Primal Visions: Albert Bierstadt 'Discovers' America," catalog essay, A Cherokee Artist Looks at the Landing of Columbus. Montclair Museum, New Jersey, 2001.
 Kay WalkingStick. "Democracy, Inc: Kay WalkingStick on Indian Law." Artforum 30, November 1991, pp. 20–21.
 Kay WalkingStick, "Native American Art in the Postmodern Era." Art Journal 51, Fall 1992, pp. 15–17. 
 Kay WalkingStick, "So Fine! Masterworks of Fine Art from the Heard Museum," curator's essay, Great American Artists, Heard Museum, Phoenix, 2002.
 W. Jackson Rushing III and Kristin Makholm, foreword by Kay WalkingStick "Modern Spirit, The Art of George Morrison". University of Oklahoma Press: Norman, 2013.
 Kay WalkingStick, "Changing Hands: Art Without Reservation 3", essay "No Reservations," Museum of Art and Design 2012.

Notes

References

Further reading
 20th Century Native American Art: Essays on History and Criticism, ed., J.W. Jackson Rushing (1998)
 Lawrence Fraser Abbott. "Kay WalkingStick." In I Stand in the Center of the Good: Interviews with Contemporary North American Artists. Lincoln: University of Nebraska Press, 1994. pp. 269–283.
 Margaret Archuletta. "Kay WalkingStick (Cherokee)." In Path Breakers. Indianapolis, Indiana: Eiteljorg Museum of American Indians and West, 2004. pp. 13–30. 
 Richard A. Bivens, '"Kay WalkingStick." Contemporary Native American Art. Oklahoma: Metro, 1983.
 Nancy Cane; Alice Dillon; Sheila Stone. 3 artists, 3 stories: Nancy Cohen, Kay WalkingStick, Bisa Washington. New Jersey Center for Visual Arts; 1999.
 Holland Cotter, Thomas W. Leavitt, Judy Collischan. Kay WalkingStick: paintings, 1974-1990. Long Island University; 1 April 1991.
 H. W. Janson. (1995) History of Art. New York: Prentice-Hall & Abrams.
 Thalia Gouma-Peterson and Kathleen McManus. Zurko. "Kay WalkingStick" in We, the Human Beings: 27 Contemporary Native American Artists. Wooster, OH: College of Wooster Art Museum, 1992. 39.
 Jeff Chang, "Who We Be, The Colorization of America".  AFTER THE EITHER AND THE OR, pg. 139-141. St. Martin's Press, New York, NY.  2014.
 Stanley I. Grand, and Southeast Missouri Regional Museum. Kay WalkingStick: mythic dances, paintings from four decades. Southeast Missouri Regional Museum; 2004.

External links
 
An oral history interview with Kay WalkingStick, conducted 2011 December 14-15, by Mija Riedel, for the Archives of American Art

1935 births
20th-century American women artists
American women painters
Artists from New York (state)
Cherokee Nation artists
Cornell University faculty
Living people
Native American painters
Native American women artists
21st-century American women artists
American women academics
20th-century Native Americans
21st-century Native Americans
20th-century Native American women
21st-century Native American women